Te Tirarau Kukupa (?–1882) was a notable New Zealand tribal leader. Of Māori descent, he identified with the Ngā Puhi and Te Parawhau iwi.

References

1882 deaths
Ngāpuhi people
Signatories of the Treaty of Waitangi
Year of birth missing